The Real O'Neals is an American single-camera sitcom that aired on ABC from March 2, 2016, to March 14, 2017. The series, based on an idea by Dan Savage (who also served as executive producer), was picked up to series on May 7, 2015. The series was renewed for a second season on May 12, 2016, which premiered on October 11, 2016.

On May 11, 2017, ABC canceled the series after two seasons.

Plot
The series chronicles the lives of a close-knit, Irish-American Chicago Catholic family whose matriarch takes their reputation in the community very seriously. In the pilot episode, their perfect image is shattered when each family member has a secret revealed to the community: middle child Kenny is gay, oldest child Jimmy is anorexic, youngest child Shannon is running a money scam and might be atheist, and parents Eileen and Pat are no longer in love and wish to divorce. Subsequent episodes explore the new family dynamic as Pat and Eileen separate and everyone reconciles Kenny's sexuality with their faith.

Cast and characters

Main
 Martha Plimpton as Eileen O'Neal, the Catholic matriarch 
 Jay R. Ferguson as Pat O'Neal, a Chicago Police Department officer who is secretly contemplating divorce
 Noah Galvin as Kenneth "Kenny" Christopher Sebastian O'Neal, the 16-year-old middle child who comes out to his family as gay
 Matthew Shively as James "Jimmy" O'Neal, the athletic 17-year-old oldest child who learns he is anorexic
 Bebe Wood as Shannon O'Neal, the 14-year-old youngest child and the only daughter who is questioning her faith
 Mary Hollis Inboden as Jodi O'Neal, Pat's ex-sister-in-law

Recurring
 Matt Oberg as Vice Principal Clive Murray, Eileen's boyfriend and Pat's friend
 Ramona Young as Allison Adler-Wong, Kenny's lesbian friend and the other member of the school's LGBT club
 Hannah Marks as Mimi Waxberg, Kenny's ex-girlfriend
 Sean Grandillo as Brett Young, Kenny's first boyfriend
 Sarayu Blue as Marcia Worthman
 Brian Huskey as Father Phil
 Caleb Pierce as Stuart
 Madison Iseman as Madison
 Kaylee Bryant as Lacey
 Jeremy Lawson as Jesus (Kenny's "shoulder angel")
 Angela Kinsey as Sheila DeMars, Eileen's rival
 Jessica-Snow Wilson as Gloria, Pat's colleague and love interest
 Christopher Avila as Ethan, Shannon's boyfriend
 Ray Ford as Steve the Colorist, Jodi's colleague
 Lizzie White as Claire, Shannon's friend

Guest
 Jimmy Kimmel as himself
 Garrett Clayton as Ricky
 Madison Pettis as Chloe Perrente
 Caroline Morahan as Maleficent (Kenny's "shoulder devil")
 Frances Conroy as Grandma Agnes
 Phil LaMarr as Archie, Pat's partner
 Ian Gomez as Michael-Gregory
 Noah Crawford as Drew
 Scott Menville as Gangbanger ("Pilot") and Tony ("The Real Halloween")
 Cheyenne Jackson as Mr. Peters
 Marija Omaljev-Grbić as Dream Woman
 Jordin Sparks as herself
 Tim Gunn as himself
 RuPaul as himself
 Tyler Oakley as himself
 Lance Bass as himself
 Jane Lynch as herself
 Gus Kenworthy as himself
 Robbie Rogers as himself
 Antonia Lofaso as herself
 Alex Guarnaschelli as herself
 Graham Elliot as himself

Episodes

Series overview

Season 1 (2016)

Season 2 (2016–17)

Ratings

Season 1 (2016)

Season 2 (2016–17)

Reception

Ratings

Critical reception
The series received a generally favorable response from critics. On review aggregator site Metacritic, The Real O'Neals has a metascore of 62 out of 100 based on 22 critics signifying "generally favorable reviews". On another review aggregator site Rotten Tomatoes, the show has a 67% approval rating, based on 27 reviews, with an average rating of 6.4/10. The site's critical consensus: "Funny writing and a solid cast save The Real O'Neals from traditional sitcom perils."

Awards and nominations

Controversies

News of the series' pickup

The news of the series' pick-up attracted attention and controversy before its debut. On May 12, 2015, the day it was announced that the series had been added to the ABC network schedule, Christian right groups such as the American Family Association and the Family Research Council called for a boycott and petitioned to prevent the series from airing. They also cited Savage's views on religion, sexuality, and same-sex marriage, which they believed had been infused into the series due to it being based on his life, but Savage claimed that the concept went in a different direction since he was not involved in the writing.

Bisexual joke
The second-season episode "The Real Acceptance" featured a joke regarding bisexuals, in which Kenny, who is openly gay, compared being bisexual to having "webbed toes" or "money problems". Bisexual actor Sara Ramirez, who played the bisexual character Callie Torres on Grey's Anatomy, criticized ABC and the series, finding the joke offensive.

References

External links
 

2016 American television series debuts
2017 American television series endings
2010s American single-camera sitcoms
2010s American LGBT-related comedy television series
2010s American teen sitcoms
English-language television shows
Religious comedy television series
Gay-related television shows
Irish-American mass media
American Broadcasting Company original programming
Television series about dysfunctional families
Television series about teenagers
Television series by ABC Studios
Television shows set in Chicago
Television shows based on books
Fictional portrayals of the Chicago Police Department
Television shows featuring audio description
American LGBT-related sitcoms